MDR-Literaturpreis was a German literary prize. The prize was awarded by the Mitteldeutscher Rundfunk from 1996 to 2015. The main prize was endowed with 5,000 euros, the second with 2,500 euros and the third with 1,500 euros (donated by Druckhaus Köthen), as well an audience award was endowed with 1000 euros. The award consisted of a literary short story competition.

Recipients
Source:
 1996 1. Prize: Renate Schröder
 1997 1. Prize: Henner Kotte
 1998 1. Prize: Ulman Weiß
 1999 1. Prize: Jörg Jacob
 2000 1. Prize: Undine Materni
 2001 1. Prize: Clemens Meyer
 2002 1. Prize: Simone Gertz, 2. Prize: Ralf Eggers, 3. Prize: Christine Hoba
 2003 1. Prize: Omar Saavedra Santis; 2. Prize: Clemens Meyer; 3. Prize: Nils Mohl
 2004 1. Prize: Bov Bjerg; 2. Prize: Jonas-Philipp Dallmann; 3. Prize: Martin Gülich; Audience Prize: Bov Bjerg
 2005 1. Prize: Silvio Huonder; 2. Prize: Martin Gülich; 3. Prize: Gunter Gerlach
 2006 1. Prize: Thomas Pletzinger; 2. Prize: Natalie Balkow; 3. Prize: Nils Mohl; Audience Prize: Thomas Pletzinger
 2007 1. Prize: Moritz Heger; 2. Prize: Margarita Fuchs; 3. Prize: Philip Meinhold; Audience Prize: Moritz Heger
 2008 1. Prize: Sudabeh Mohafez; 2. Prize: Bernd Hans Martens; 3. Prize: Ralf Eggers; Audience Prize: Finn-Ole Heinrich
 2009 1. Prize: Katharina Hartwell; 2. Prize: Andreas Stichmann; 3. Prize: Stefan Petermann; Audience Prize: Stefan Petermann
 2010 1. Prize: Leif Randt; 2. Prize: Florian Wacker; 3. Prize: Irma Krauß; Audience Prize: Diana Feuerbach
 2011 1. Prize: Matthias Nawrat; 2. Prize: Susanne Neuffer; 3. Prize: Jesse Falzoi; Audience Prize: Simone Kanter
 2012 1. Prize: Gianna Molinari; 2. Prize: Ursula Kirchenmayer; 3. Prize: Alina Herbing; Audience Prize: Gianna Molinari
 2013 1. Prize: Anja Kampmann; 2. Prize: Ferdinand Schmalz; 3. Prize: Verena Güntner; Audience Prize: Peter Wawerzinek
 2014 1. Prize: Stefan Ferdinand Etgeton; 2. Prize: Sarah J. Ablett; 3. Prize: Kathrin Schmidt; Audience Prize: Stefan Ferdinand Etgeton
 2015 1. Prize: Ronya Othmann; 2. Prize: Irina Kilimnik; 3. Prize: Anja Dolatta; Audience Prize: Irina Kilimnik

References

Mitteldeutscher Rundfunk
German literary awards